Thin Man 1 is the 1999 debut album of second generation Beijing hard rock band Thin Man. The album brought Chinese rock music out of a commercial trough at the end of the 90s, selling 100,000 copies in three months from its issue in August 1999.

References

1999 debut albums
Thin Man (band) albums